Genotina adamii is a species of sea snail, a marine gastropod mollusk in the family Mangeliidae.

Description
The shell of the adult snail grows to a length of 18 mm.

Distribution
Genotina adamii is a demersal sea snail living in tropical Indo-Pacific waters off the Philippines.

References

 Bozzetti, L., 1994. A new species from Philippines. World Shells 9: 60-62
 Vera-Peláez. 2004. Genotina genotae new species and new genus and Genota nigeriensis new species of the subfamily Conorbiinae (Gastropoda, Turridae). Systematic, biogeography, stratigraphy and phylogeny of Conorbis, Genotina and Genota genera. Pliocenica, 4 : 95-106

External links
 
  Tucker, J.K. 2004 Catalog of recent and fossil turrids (Mollusca: Gastropoda). Zootaxa 682:1–1295.
 Holotype in the MNHN, Paris

adamii
Gastropods described in 1994